Mournument is a 2004 album by the Dutch doom metal band Deinonychus. It was recorded for the Italian record label My Kingdom Music and was recorded in Mellrichstadt, Germany.

Track listing 

Original CD

Personnel 

Performers
 Staff Glover - bass
 Marco Kehren - vocals, guitar, bass
 Arkdae - keyboard
 William A. Sarginson - Drums

Production
 William A. Sarginson - Drumtracks
 Marco Kehren - Mixed and Mastered
 Markus Stock - Mixed and Mastered

Notes 

2002 albums
Deinonychus (band) albums